Khawaja Zaki Hasan, known as Zaki Hasan or K. Zaki Hasan, is a Pakistani physician, neuropsychiatrist and a former chairman of UNICEF (1979–1980).

He was professor of neuropsychiatry at the Jinnah Post Graduate Medical Centre in Karachi, and was particularly focused on the health and social aspects of children. He became a member of the UNICEF executive board at the international level in 1972 and served until 1981, for the last terms as first vice-chairman and finally as chairman.

References

Pakistani psychiatrists
Chairmen and Presidents of UNICEF
Year of birth missing (living people)
Living people
Pakistani officials of the United Nations